This article details the 2011–12 UEFA Europa League group stage.

The group stage featured 48 teams: the 38 winners of the play-off round, and the 10 losing teams from the Champions League play-off round.

The teams were drawn into twelve groups of four, and played each other home-and-away in a round-robin format. The matchdays were 15 September, 29 September, 20 October, 3 November, 30 November–1 December, and 14–15 December 2011.

The top two teams in each group advanced to the round of 32, where they were joined by the eight third-placed teams from the Champions League group stage.

Seeding
The draw for the group stage was held at Grimaldi Forum, Monaco on 26 August 2011 at 13:00 CEST (UTC+02:00).

Teams were seeded into four pots based on their 2011 UEFA club coefficients. Pot 1 held teams ranked 18–49, Pot 2 held teams ranked 51–85, Pot 3 held teams ranked 89–154, while Pot 4 held teams ranked 155–302 and unranked teams.

CL-CR Losing teams from the Champions League play-off round (Champions Route)

CL-LR Losing teams from the Champions League play-off round (League Route)

† Celtic lodged protests over the eligibility of a number of the Sion players who participated in the two legs of the play-off round, which Sion won 3–1 aggregate (first leg: 0–0; second leg: 3–1). The UEFA Control and Disciplinary Body accepted the protests and decided to award both matches to Celtic by forfeit (3–0). As a consequence, Celtic qualified for the UEFA Europa League group stage.

For the group stage draw, teams from the same national association could not be drawn against each other. Moreover, the draw was controlled for teams from the same association in order to split the teams evenly for maximum television coverage. For example, if there were two teams from the same association, each team was drawn into a different set of groups (A–F, G–L); if there were four teams from the same association, each team was drawn into a different subset of groups (A–C, D–F, G–I, J–L).

The fixtures were decided after the draw. On the first four matchdays, when matches were played only on Thursdays, six groups played their matches at 19:00 CET/CEST, while the other six groups played their matches at 21:05 CET/CEST, with the two sets of groups (A–F, G–L) alternating between each matchday. On the final two matchdays, when matches were played on both Wednesdays and Thursdays, the two sets of groups were divided into four smaller subsets (A–C, D–F, G–I, J–L), with each subset of groups playing on a different day and time. There are other restrictions, e.g., teams from the same city (e.g. Tottenham Hotspur and Fulham) do not play at home on the same matchday (UEFA tries to avoid teams from the same city play at home on the same day), and Russian teams do not play at home on the last matchday due to cold weather.

Tie-breaking criteria
If two or more teams were equal on points on completion of the group matches, the following criteria would be applied to determine the rankings:
higher number of points obtained in the group matches played among the teams in question;
superior goal difference from the group matches played among the teams in question;
higher number of goals scored in the group matches played among the teams in question;
higher number of goals scored away from home in the group matches played among the teams in question;
If, after applying criteria 1) to 4) to several teams, two teams still have an equal ranking, the criteria 1) to 4) will be reapplied to determine the ranking of these teams;
superior goal difference from all group matches played;
higher number of goals scored from all group matches played;
higher number of coefficient points accumulated by the club in question, as well as its association, over the previous five seasons.

Groups 
Times up to 29 October 2011 (matchdays 1–3) are CEST (UTC+02:00), thereafter (matchdays 4–6) times are CET (UTC+01:00).

Group A

Group B

Group C 

Notes
Note 1: Rapid București played their home matches at Arena Națională, Bucharest as they have left their own Stadionul Giuleşti-Valentin Stănescu prior to the season.

Group D 

Notes
Note 2: Vaslui played their home matches at Stadionul Ceahlăul, Piatra Neamț as their own Stadionul Municipal did not meet UEFA criteria.

Group E

Group F 

Tiebreakers
Red Bull Salzburg and Paris Saint-Germain are ranked by their head-to-head records (decided by away goals), as shown below.

Group G 

Tiebreakers
AZ and Austria Wien are tied on their head-to-head records as shown below, so AZ are ranked ahead of Austria Wien because of their higher overall goal difference in the group.

Group H 

Tiebreakers
Club Brugge and Braga are ranked by their head-to-head records, as shown below.

Group I

Group J 

Notes
Note 3: Steaua București played their home match against Schalke 04 at Stadionul Dr. Constantin Rădulescu, Cluj-Napoca as the UEFA Euro 2012 qualifying Group D match between Romania and France left the grass at the Arena Națională in an unplayable state. 
Note 4: AEK Larnaca played their home matches at GSP Stadium, Nicosia as their own GSZ Stadium did not meet UEFA criteria.

Group K

Group L 

Tiebreakers
AEK Athens and Sturm Graz are ranked by their head-to-head records, as shown below.

References

External links
2011–12 UEFA Europa League, UEFA.com

Group stage
2011-12